Pyractomena borealis is a species of firefly in the beetle family Lampyridae. It is found in North America, where it has a very wide distribution, as it is known from Alberta east to the Maritime Provinces of Canada, and south to all US states east of the Mississippi River.

References

Further reading

 
 
 

Lampyridae
Bioluminescent insects
Articles created by Qbugbot
Beetles described in 1828